USNS Fast Tempo is an ocean tug and supply ship for the United States Sealift Command. She was originally named MV Fast Tempo before being acquired by the United States Navy.

Construction and commissioning 
She was completed by Breaux Brothers Enterprises, Los Angeles in 2006. She was under the ownership of United Marine Holdings.

In 2012, she was then bought by U.S. Navy to be used in support of the  Offshore Petroleum Distribution System (OPDS).

References

Transports of the United States Navy
Ships built in California
2006 ships